Meshgin-e Sharqi Rural District is in the Central District of Meshgin Shahr County, Ardabil province, Iran. At the census of 2006, its population was 10,335 in 2,496 households; there were 10,624 inhabitants in 2,982 households at the following census of 2011; and in the most recent census of 2016, the population of the rural district was 9,749 in 3,013 households. The largest of its 24 villages was Alni, with 3,739 people.

References 

Meshgin Shahr County

Rural Districts of Ardabil Province

Populated places in Ardabil Province

Populated places in Meshgin Shahr County